BCD may refer to:

Computing
 Binary-coded decimal, a representation of decimal digits in binary
 BCD (character encoding), a 6-bit superset of binary-coded decimal derived from the binary encoding of the same name
 Boot Configuration Data, the configuration data required to boot Microsoft Windows Vista and later
 Bipolar-CMOS-DMOS, a type of BiCMOS semiconductor technology

Organisations
 Basnahira Cricket Dundee, a Sri Lankan cricket team
 BCD Tofu House, a Los Angeles based Korean restaurant chain
 BCD Travel, a provider of global corporate travel management
 Belarusian Christian Democracy, a Christian-democratic political party in Belarus.
 Berkshire Country Day School, an independent school in Lenox, Massachusetts, US
 Bid Closing Date The closing date for a bid is a specific date (and usually a specific time) when the bid is closed to the public for bid submissions. At this point, only the submitted proposals will be considered eligible.
 The British Columbia Dragoons, a Canadian Forces armoured regiment

Places
 Bacolod–Silay International Airport (IATA code), Silay City, Philippines
 Beirut Central District, Beirut, Lebanon

Other uses
 Bad conduct discharge, a form of discharge from US military service, sometimes referred to colloquially as a "big chicken dinner".
 Barrels per calendar day, a unit for measuring output of oil refineries
 Blue compact dwarf galaxy, a small galaxy which contains large clusters of young, hot, massive stars
 Board-certified diplomate, in the list of credentials in psychology
 Buoyancy control device, in scuba diving
 Bolt circle diameter, for example, of a crankset, of a bicycle disc brake, or in wheel sizing

See also
 BCD in the sugar baby/sugar daddy (SBSD) community means Behind Closed Doors.  
BCDS (disambiguation)